GigaScience is a peer-reviewed scientific journal that was established in 2012. It covers research and large data-sets that result from work in the biomedical and life sciences. The editor-in-chief is Scott Edmunds. Originally, the journal was co-published by BioMed Central and the Beijing Genomics Institute (BGI). In 2016, it left BioMed Central to form a new partnership between the GigaScience Press department of BGI and Oxford University Press. In 2018, GigaScience won the Association of American Publishers' PROSE Award for Innovation in journal publishing in the multidisciplinary category.

GigaDB and GigaGalaxy
In order to host the large data-sets the journal covers, GigaScience has built and integrated its own disciplinary repository: GigaDB. The journal also provides a Galaxy-based platform to analyze data, GigaGalaxy. The journal has tried to promote the use of Galaxy pipelines as publishable research outputs through its 'Galaxy Series' of articles.

Abstracting and indexing
The journal is abstracted and indexed by Index Medicus/MEDLINE/PubMed, the Science Citation Index Expanded, CAS, CNKI, EMBASE and Scopus. According to the Journal Citation Reports, the journal has a 2021 impact factor of 7.658.

References

External links 

Journal site at BioMed Central
GigaGalaxy 

Biology journals
Creative Commons Attribution-licensed journals
Publications established in 2012
Oxford University Press academic journals
English-language journals